The Prescott Town House is a historic former town hall on MA 32 in Petersham, Massachusetts.

The building was built in 1838 in a Greek Revival style and served as the town hall for Prescott, Massachusetts, a town that was unincorporated in order to make way for the Quabbin Reservoir in the 1930s.  The town house was moved to Petersham, where it is now located on a hill above a hay meadow north of the town center.  This move was funded by Judge John Monroe Woolsey, who used the building as a law library and office.

The building was listed on the National Register of Historic Places in 1989.

See also
National Register of Historic Places listings in Worcester County, Massachusetts

References

National Register of Historic Places in Worcester County, Massachusetts
Buildings and structures in Petersham, Massachusetts
City and town halls on the National Register of Historic Places in Massachusetts